Bothrocophias campbelli, commonly known as Campbell's toadheaded viper, the Ecuadorian toadheaded pitviper, and víbora boca de sapo in Spanish, is a species of venomous pitviper in the family Viperidae. The species is endemic to South America. No subspecies are currently recognized.

Etymology
Bothrocophias campbelli was named in honor of American herpetologist Jonathan A. Campbell.

Description

The scalation includes 21–25 (usually 23) rows of dorsal scales at midbody, all of which are keeled except for the first rows. The posterior dorsals have tubercular keels, even in small specimens, while in large specimens these keels are highly elevated. There are 152-167/159-177 ventral scales in males/females and 51-64/48-60 paired subcaudal scales in males/females. On the head there are 3–8 intersupraocular scales, 7–8 supralabial scales, the second of which is usually fused with the prelacunal to form a lacunolabial, and 9–10 (usually 9) sublabial scales.

Geographic range
Bothrocophias campbelli is found in the Pacific lowlands and slopes from west-central Colombia to Ecuador. The type locality given is "Recinto Huagal-Sacramento, cantón Pallatanga, Provincia de Chimborazo, Ecuador. 1500–2000 mts. de altura [4,900–6,600 feet]".

Habitat

Diet
B. campbelli preys upon caecilians, lizards, snakes of the genus Atractus, and small rodents.

Reproduction
B. campbelli is viviparous.

Taxonomy
In previous accounts, Bothrocophias campbelli has often been included in Bothrops pulcher (W. Peters, 1862), e.g., Lachesis pulcher — Boulenger, 1896, Bothrops pulchra — Amaral, 1923, and Bothrops pulcher — J.Peters & Orejas-Miranda, 1970. Campbell and Lamar (1992) considered Bothrocophias campbelli to be a junior synonym of Bothrops pulcher, but their concept of the latter taxon was incorrect. Schätti and Kramer (1993) argued that Bothrops campbelli (Freire-Lascano, 1991) was a nomen invalidum and suggested a new name, Porthidium almawebi, as a replacement. However, it is clear that Freire-Lascano's (1991) scientific name is valid and has priority over the one proposed by Schätti and Kramer (1993).

Gutberlet and Campbell (2001) moved this taxon to a new genus: Bothrocophias (toadheaded pitvipers).

References

Further reading
Freire-Lascano A (1991). "Dos nuevas especies de Bothrops en el Ecuador ". Publicaciones de Trabajos Científicos del Ecuador, Universidad Técnica de Machala 2: 1–11. (Bothrops campbelli, new species). (in Spanish).
Gutberlet RL, Campbell JA (2001). "Generic recognition for a neglected lineage of South American pitvipers (Squamata: Viperidae: Crotalinae), with the description of a new species from the Colombian Chocó". American Museum Novitates (3316): 1–15. (Bothrocophias campbelli, new combination).
Rojas-Rivera, Alejandra; Castillo, Karen; Gutiérrez-Cárdenas, Paul David Alfonso (2013). "Bothrocophias campbelli (Campbell's Toad-headed Pit Viper, Víbora Boca de Sapo de Campbell). Diet/Ophiophagy". Herpetological Review 44 (3): 518.
Valencia, Jorge H.; Garzón, Katty; Betancourt-Yépez, Raquel (2008). "Notes on the reproduction of the Ecuadorian toad-headed pitviper Bothrocophias campbelli (Freire-Lascano, 1991)". Herpetozoa 21 (1/2): 95–96.

campbelli
Snakes of South America
Reptiles of Colombia
Reptiles of Ecuador
Reptiles described in 1991
Taxa named by Antonio Freire Lascano